The Săraz is a right tributary of the river Glavița in Romania. It flows into the Glavița near Jupani. Part of its flow is redirected towards the Gladna.

References

Rivers of Romania
Rivers of Timiș County